, provisional designation , is a trans-Neptunian object from in the scattered disc located in the outermost region of the Solar System. It was discovered on 26 February 2010, by astronomers with the Pan-STARRS survey at Haleakala Observatory on the island of Maui, Hawaii, in the United States. It was numbered in 2018 and remains unnamed.

Orbit and classification 

 orbits the Sun at a distance of 45.1–65.5 AU once every 411 years (150,152 days; semi-major axis of 55.29 AU). Its orbit has an eccentricity of 0.18 and an inclination of 41° with respect to the ecliptic.

This distant minor planet is a trans-Neptunian object and a member of the scattered disc population. Scattered-disc objects are thought to have been ejected from the classical Kuiper belt into their current orbits by gravitational interactions with Neptune, and typically have highly eccentric orbits and perihelia of less than 38 AU.

 has also been considered a detached object, since its relatively low eccentricity of 0.18, and its perihelion distance of 45.1 AU are hard to reconcile with the celestial mechanics of a scattered-disc object.

This has led to some uncertainty as to the current theoretical understanding of the outermost Solar System. The theories include close stellar passages, unseen planet/rogue planets/planetary embryos in the early Kuiper belt, and resonance interaction with an outward-migrating Neptune.

Numbering and naming 

The body's observation arc begins with a precovery taken by the Sloan Digital Sky Survey at Apache Point Observatory in March 2003, almost seven years prior to its official discovery observation at Haleakala. It was numbered by the Minor Planet Center on 25 September 2018. As of 2018, it has not been named.

Physical characteristics

Diameter and albedo 

 has an absolute magnitude of 4.8. According to the Johnston's archive and astronomer Michael Brown, it measures 486 and 490 kilometers in diameter, based on an assumed albedo for the body's surface of 0.09 and 0.07, respectively. As of 2018, no physical characteristics have been determined from photometric observations. The body's color, rotation period, pole and shape remain unknown.

References

External links 
 Discovery Circumstances: Numbered Minor Planets (520001)-(525000) – Minor Planet Center
 List Of Centaurs and Scattered-Disk Objects, Minor Planet Center
 
 

523635
523635
523635
20100226